The Living End is an Australian punk rock/psychobilly band.

The Living End may also refer to:

In music:
 The Living End (Hüsker Dü album), 1994
 The Living End (Jandek album), 1989
 The Living End (The Living End album), 1998
 "The Living End", a song by The Jesus and Mary Chain from Psychocandy

In other media:
 The Living End (film), a 1992 film by Gregg Araki
 The Living End (TV series), a 1972 unsold TV pilot starring Louis Gossett Jr.
 The Living End, a 1979 novel by Stanley Elkin